Joseph Charles Ashdown (30 December 1922 – 29 August 1982) was an Australian rules footballer who played with St Kilda in the Victorian Football League (VFL).

Family
The son of Joseph Henry Ashdown (1891-1969), and Rebecca Ashdown (1886-1966), née Wakeling, Joseph Charles Ashdown was born at Toorak, Victoria on 30 December 1922.

He married Noreen Alice Kennedy in 1945. Together they had two children, a son Wayne Joseph Ashdown born 31 January 1951 and Janus Ashdown.

Military service
Ashdown served as a leading aircraftman in the Royal Australian Air Force during the Second World War from December 1941 until April 1946.

Death
He died at Amstel golf course Cranbourne, Victoria on 29 August 1982.

Notes

References
 
 Sportsmen All, The Sporting Globe, (Saturday, 27 June 1942), p.3.
 World War Two Nominal Roll: Leading Aircraftman Joseph Charles Ashdown (49492), Department of Veteran's Affairs.
 A9301, 49492: World War Two Service Record: Leading Aircraftman Joseph Charles Ashdown (49492), National Archives of Australia.
 E. Henfry Awaits W A Decision, The Argus, (Thursday, 27 June 1946), p.13.
 South hang on to Chambers: Wanted by VFA, The Argus, (Friday, 30 May 1947), p.12.

External links 
 Joseph Ashdown at Demonwiki.
 
 
 Joe Ashdown at The VFA Project.

1922 births
1982 deaths
Australian rules footballers from Melbourne
St Kilda Football Club players
Royal Australian Air Force personnel of World War II
Royal Australian Air Force airmen
People from Toorak, Victoria
Military personnel from Melbourne